Apantesis proxima, the Mexican tiger moth, is a moth of the family Erebidae. It was described by Felix Guérin-Méneville in 1844.

Apantesis proxima was formerly a member of the genus Notarctia, which was combined with Apantesis as a result of phylogenetic and molecular analysis in 2016.

Subspecies
Apantesis proxima proxima
Apantesis proxima mormonica (Neumoegen, 1885)

Description
The length of the forewings is 14–20 mm. Adults are sexually dimorphic. Females have reddish-pink hindwings, while those are white in males. Adults are on wing from April to October in several generations per year.

This species can be found in North America from south-eastern Oregon and southern Idaho to Nevada, western Utah and California, as well as in Mexico.

References

Arctiina
Moths described in 1844